Simon Andrews may refer to:
 Simon Andrews (composer) (born 1958), British composer
 Simon Andrews (cricketer) (born 1980), New Zealand cricketer
 Simon Andrews (motorcyclist) (1982–2014), British motorcycle racer